A cult film, also commonly referred to as a cult classic, is a film with a cult following, obscure or unpopular with mainstream audiences, and often revolutionary or ironically enjoyed. Sometimes, the definition is expanded to exclude films that have been released by major studios or have big budgets, try specifically to become cult films, or become accepted by mainstream audiences and critics. Cult films are defined as much by audience reaction as they are by content.

The following is a list of cult films organized alphabetically by title:

 List of cult films: 0-9
 List of cult films: A
 List of cult films: B
List of cult films: C
List of cult films: D
List of cult films: E
List of cult films: F
List of cult films: G
List of cult films: H
List of cult films: I
List of cult films: J
List of cult films: K
List of cult films: L
List of cult films: M
List of cult films: N
List of cult films: O
List of cult films: P
List of cult films: Q
List of cult films: R
List of cult films: S
List of cult films: T
List of cult films: U
List of cult films: V
List of cult films: W
List of cult films: X
List of cult films: Y
List of cult films: Z

See also 

 B-Movie
 Underground film
 Sleeper hit
 Midnight movie
 List of cult television shows

References 

Cult films list
Cult